The Gorlok is Webster University's school mascot. It is a make-believe creature that was designed by Webster staff and students through a school contest. It has the paws of a speeding cheetah, the horns of a fierce buffalo, and the friendly face of a Saint Bernard dog.

Origin of the name 
The name was derived from the combination of the two streets that intersect in the heart of Old Webster, Gore and Lockwood Avenues. The name was chosen in June 1984 by a campus committee that considered many suggestions before settling on the nickname.

History 
Once a name was chosen, a contest was run in the October 4, 1984 issue of The Journal, the Webster University student newspaper. At the time the contest was run, only the name Gorlok had been decided. The contest required the applicants to submit a sketch as well as a description of how they thought a Gorlok would look. The winning entry included a picture of a blue and yellow creature holding a hand-held pump sprayer.

The first life-size reproduction of the Gorlok was not complete until 1988, and made its debut at the February 9, 1988 men's basketball game between Webster and St. Louis Christian College. That first Gorlok stood 6'3" and was covered in blue fur. It was designed and created by Jana Park-Rogers, a costume designer for The Repertory Theatre of St. Louis, and Teri McConnell, creator of "Fredbird", the St. Louis Cardinals mascot.

The appearance of the Gorlok has changed over time. The current look is a golden furred creature sporting a blue T-shirt emblazoned with a white "W".

Sources
The Gorlok - Webster University
Image
Webster University
Fictional hybrids
College mascots in the United States
Animal mascots
Mascots introduced in 1984